This is a list of airports in the British Indian Ocean Territory.

See also 
 List of airports in the United Kingdom and the British Crown Dependencies
 List of airports by ICAO code: F#FJ – British Indian Ocean Territory

References 

Airports in the British Indian Ocean Territory at Great Circle Mapper

Airports
Airports
Indian Ocean Territory
British Indian Ocean Territory